Goodman Games is an American game publisher best known for the Dungeon Crawl Classics series of adventure modules and role-playing game, the Dragonmech role-playing game, and the Etherscope role-playing games. The company produced licensed adventures for Wicked Fantasy Factory, Judges Guild, Xcrawl, Iron Heroes, Castles and Crusades, and Death Dealer.

History 
Joseph Goodman started Goodman Games in 2001 and took advantage of the new d20 System license by publishing his first RPG, Broncosaurus Rex. Goodman Games released a series of Complete Guides beginning with Complete Guide to Drow (2002), and another 10 books after that, several of which focused on unusual races that were not being covered by other publishers, such as Complete Guide to Doppelgangers (2002), Complete Guide to Rakshasas (2003), Complete Guide to Treants (2003), and Complete Guide to Wererats (2003). Despite success with Broncosaurus Rex and then moving to fantasy dungeon crawls, Goodman did not hire any in-house game designers and continued to work with freelance creators. With the Dungeon Crawl Classics label, Goodman intended to publish intelligent dungeon crawl adventures and to serve the growing demographic of older gamers. Goodman Games expanded into a wide range of fantasy and science fiction role playing game (RPG) supplements, mostly for the d20 license; which meant adventures compatible with the 3rd edition of Dungeons & Dragons ruleset. 

Their card games include Geek Wars, World Championship Dodge Ball, and Scavenger Hunt.

In 2018, Goodman Games released Mutant Crawl Classics, a post-apocalyptic role playing game compatible with the Dungeon Crawl Classics Role Playing Game ruleset. 

Leaked documents from Wizard of the Coast in January 2023 suggested that Wizards planned to change the Open Game License (OGL), developed for its Dungeons & Dragons products, to be more restrictive and potentially harm third-party content creators. Goodman Games stated that "WotC's proposed changes to the OGL would have no impact on their lines". In response to the OGL leak, Paizo announced plans to develop a new license called the Open RPG Creative License (ORC) – this would be an open, perpetual, and irrevocable system-agnostic license stewarded by a nonprofit. This license will be open to publishers besides Paizo; Goodman Games joined the ORC License Alliance on January 13, 2023. Polygon reported that "in the weeks that Hasbro spent publicly flailing, customers spent an extraordinary amount of money investing in its competition". Goodman Games stated that January 2023 was "the best sales month in its two-decade history. Sales through the Goodman Games online store reached an all-time high, exceeding even prior Black Friday and holiday special events, while other channels saw similar growth. Dungeon Crawl Classics core rulebooks moved at a brisk pace throughout the month, as several accessories and adventure modules sold out, and the DCC core rulebook accelerated toward the end of its current print run".

Dungeon Crawl Classics role playing game

In May 2012, Goodman Games released an original OGL-based role-playing game named after their earlier series of D&D-compatible adventures called Dungeon Crawl Classics Role Playing Game (DCC RPG). The design intention was "to create a modern RPG that reflects D&D’s origin-point concepts with decades-later rules editions."

Community activity 
In July 2009, Goodman Games held a contest to award a Game Store with the award of "America's Favorite Game Store". The award went to Yottaquest.

Reception
Goodman Games won the 2006 Gold Ennie Award for "The Grognard Award".

Goodman Games won the 2013 Silver Ennie Award for "Fans’ Choice for Favorite Publisher".

Notes 

ENnies winners
Game manufacturers
Role-playing game publishing companies